Rajiv Chandrasekaran is an American journalist. He is a senior correspondent and associate editor at The Washington Post, where he has worked since 1994.

Life
He grew up mostly in the San Francisco Bay area. He attended Stanford University, where he became editor-in-chief of The Stanford Daily and earned a degree in political science.

At The Post he has served as bureau chief in Baghdad, Cairo, and Southeast Asia, and as a correspondent covering the war in Afghanistan. During 2003, the Post put his stories on the front page 138 times. 
In 2004, he was journalist-in-residence at the Johns Hopkins University School of Advanced International Studies, and a public policy scholar at the Woodrow Wilson International Center for Scholars.

Chandrasekaran's 2006 book Imperial Life in the Emerald City: Inside Iraq's Green Zone won the 2007 Samuel Johnson Prize and was a finalist for the 2006 National Book Awards for non-fiction. The film Green Zone (2010) is "credited as having been 'inspired by'" the book.

References

Bibliography

 (with Howard Schultz)

External links
Official page
Interview with The Guardian

C-SPAN Q&A interview with Chandrasekaran on Imperial Life in the Emerald City, September 24, 2006

Living people
Stanford University alumni
The Washington Post people
American male journalists
American writers of Indian descent
Year of birth missing (living people)